Railnews is a national monthly newspaper and news website for the British railway network.

Content
Railnews concentrates on issues important to employees of the railway industry, such as investment, careers, changes to industry structure, and political developments, as well as industrial relations and other trade union matters. It also maintains a focus on the people of the rail industry, rather than the companies alone. As a trade title covering the modern industry, it is not designed for railway enthusiasts or the heritage railway market.

The ethos of Railnews is to be "dispassionate, objective and accurate". Following this, Railnews never carries unmarked advertorials, although much of its advertising revenue does come from major rail firms and franchise operators.

History

Railnews, in the early days spelt 'Rail News', was originally the house newspaper of British Railways, published by the British Railways Board. It first appeared in 1963 under the editorship of Keith Horrox with a price of 6d, replacing the former magazines which had been produced for each railway Region, although Regional 'slip' pages continued for many years. From 1978 to October 1996 it was issued free to all employees of British Rail. An attempt to sell it as a result of the privatisation of British Rail was unsuccessful and production ceased in October 1996. In February 1997 the title was revived by some former BR managers, with Sir William McAlpine as Chairman and Cyril Bleasdale as Managing Director. Both have maintained these positions ever since. Only four months went by between the ending of the BR version and the launch of its independent successor.

Today
Railnews is no longer a house journal with a particular stance to maintain and, although fully supportive of the industry it serves, it carries objective, balanced reports. Distributed to both individual subscribers and large railway companies (who have corporate subscriptions) it penetrates the entire industry from trackside to boardroom.

The newspaper and website were both fully redesigned in February 2012, bringing a new, cleaner, more modern look to the title. Since September 2009 the Managing Editor has been former BBC journalist Sim Harris. He succeeded Paul Whiting, who is now Consulting Editor.

References

External links
Official website

British Rail
Monthly magazines published in the United Kingdom
Magazines established in 1963
Rail transport magazines published in the United Kingdom
1963 establishments in the United Kingdom